is a Japanese footballer. He currently plays for Roasso Kumamoto.

National team career
In August 2007, Hara was elected Japan U-17 national team for 2007 U-17 World Cup. But he did not play in the match, as he was the team's reserve goalkeeper behind Ryotaro Hironaga.

Club statistics
Updated to 23 February 2018.

1Includes Japanese Super Cup and FIFA Club World Cup.

References

External links 

Profile at Ehime FC 
Profile at Sanfrecce Hiroshima 

1990 births
Living people
Association football people from Shimane Prefecture
Japanese footballers
J1 League players
J2 League players
Sanfrecce Hiroshima players
Roasso Kumamoto players
Ehime FC players
Association football goalkeepers